The 2nd Central Executive Committee of the Communist Party of China (Traditional Chinese: 中共第二中央執行委員會) convened from 1922 to 1923. It followed the 1st National Congress of the Communist Party of China. This was the first form of a central committee organ elected by the Party, but modern sessions of the Central Committee of the Communist Party of China are by custom, numbered according to the session of the National Congress at which they are elected.

Because of the small size of the Party at the first National Congress, a Central Committee was not chosen.  The name "Central Executive Committee" was used until the convocating of the 5th CPC National Congress in 1927, at which time it was shortened to Central Committee.

Members
Chen Duxiu
Deng Zhongxia
Zhang Guotao
Cai Hesen
Gao Junyu

There were also 3 alternate members.

External links
 2nd Central Executive Committee of the CPC, People's Daily Online.

Central Committee of the Chinese Communist Party
1922 establishments in China
1923 disestablishments in China